The 2022–23 Iraqi Premier League is the 49th season of the Iraqi Premier League, the highest tier football league in Iraq, since its establishment in 1974. The season started on 9 October 2022 and will end in July 2023.

Al-Hudood, Karbalaa and Duhok joined as the promoted clubs from the 2021–22 Iraq Division One, replacing Amanat Baghdad, Al-Minaa and Samarra who were relegated.

Teams

Clubs and locations

Managerial changes

League table

Results

Relegation play-off
The 18th-placed team in the Premier League will face the 3rd-placed team in the Division One in a play-off match for a place in next season's Premier League.

Additional play-offs for qualifications
Due to the change of AFC competition dates to an autumn–spring format, two seasons of Iraqi domestic football will have been completed before the next AFC competitions begin, therefore requiring additional play-offs to be held between the qualifying teams from each season.

AFC Champions League play-off

AFC Cup play-offs

Season statistics

Top scorers

Hat-tricks

Notes
(H) – Home team(A) – Away team

Discipline

Club
 Most yellow cards: 58
Zakho

 Most red cards: 6
Karbalaa

Fewest yellow cards: 35
Al-Zawraa

Fewest red cards: 0
Al-Karkh
Al-Najaf
Erbil
Naft Maysan

Awards

Monthly awards

References

External links 
Official website 
Iraq Football Association

Iraqi Premier League seasons
1
Iraq